Code page 1124 (CCSID 1124), also known as CP1124, is a modified version of ISO 8859-5 that was designed to cover the Ukrainian language. It is identical to ISO 8859-5 except for replacing the Macedonian characters Ѓ and ѓ with the Ukrainian Ґ and ґ.

Code page layout
Differences from ISO 8859-5 have the equivalent Unicode code point below the character.

References

External links 

1124
Ukrainian language